The French submarine Amphitrite was the lead boat of the class of eight submarines built for the French Navy during the 1910s and completed during World War I.

See also 
List of submarines of France

Bibliography

 

Amphitrite-class submarines
1914 ships
Ships built in France